Godfrey Zolile Sapula (born 17 November 1973) is a former South African soccer player who played as a midfielder. He played for Premier Soccer League clubs Jomo Cosmos, Orlando Pirates, Mamelodi Sundowns and Platinum Stars, Chilean club Colo-Colo, Turkish club Ankaragücü and the South African national team.

Honours

Club
Colo-Colo
 Primera División de Chile: 1998

References

1973 births
Living people
Sportspeople from Soweto
Soccer players from Gauteng
South African soccer players
South Africa international soccer players
South African expatriate soccer players
Association football midfielders
MKE Ankaragücü footballers
Jomo Cosmos F.C. players
Colo-Colo footballers
Orlando Pirates F.C. players
Mamelodi Sundowns F.C. players
Platinum Stars F.C. players
Chilean Primera División players
Süper Lig players
Expatriate footballers in Chile
Expatriate footballers in Turkey
South African expatriate sportspeople in Chile
South African expatriate sportspeople in Turkey